Indian Skimmer (foaled 1984 in Kentucky) is an American-bred, British-trained Thoroughbred racehorse. Trained by Sir Henry Cecil, she was the winner of nine high-class races in Europe, including the French Oaks, the Champion Stakes and the Irish Champion Stakes. Indian Skimmer is one of the top-rated fillies in Europe since World War II.

Background
Bred by MIT graduate Ronald J. Worswick in partnership with Ashford Stud in Versailles, Kentucky, the gray filly is out of the mare Nobilaire and sired by Storm Bird. Her grandsire was Northern Dancer, the top sire of the 20th Century and her damsire was Prix de l'Arc de Triomphe winner, Vaguely Noble. She was named for the rare Indian skimmer (Rynchops albicollis), a bird.

Racing career
Owned by Sheik Mohammed bin Rashid Al Maktoum and trained by Henry Cecil, Indian Skimmer won top-class Group One races against the best fillies of the day, including a victory over Miesque in the 1987 Prix de Diane. In 1988, she beat some of the best colts in England, Ireland and France. Sent to Churchill Downs in Louisville, Kentucky, she finished third to Great Communicator in that year's Breeders' Cup Turf.

Breeding record
Retired from racing at the end of the 1989 season. As a broodmare, she produced the Mr. Prospector colt, Manshood, who is the sire of the champion South African mare, Ipi Tombe.

References
 Bloodhorse.com article on Indian Skimmer and her breeder, Ronald J. Worswick
 Indian Skimmer's pedigree and partial racing stats

1984 racehorse births
Thoroughbred family 9-b
Racehorses bred in Kentucky
Racehorses trained in the United Kingdom
French Thoroughbred Classic Race winners